Founded in 2012, Expert Global Solutions, Inc., (EGS, formerly NCO Group), based in Plano, Texas, was a privately owned business process outsourcing company.   It is a holding company for NCO Group and APAC Customer Services, Inc. (APAC), providers of business process outsourcing services. NCO provides accounts receivable management (ARM) services, and APAC provides customer relationship management (CRM) services. EGS has over 100 locations, with more than 42,000 employees. EGS was formerly owned by One Equity Partners (OEP), the private investment arm of JP Morgan Chase & Co.

In 2016, the company was acquired by Alorica Inc, a California-based customer service company.

References

 

Companies based in Plano, Texas
Private equity portfolio companies
Debt collection
Collection agencies